Somerton is a city in Yuma County, Arizona, United States. As of the 2010 census the population was 14,287. It is part of the Yuma Metropolitan Statistical Area.

Somerton was established in 1898 and incorporated in 1918. Somerton's economy is based on agriculture, medical services, and tourism.

Geography
Somerton is located at  (32.597258, -114.712242).

Demographics

At the 2000 census, there were 7,266 people in 1,818 households, including 1,652 families, in the city. The racial makeup of the city was 44.5% White, 0.4% Black or African American, 0.7% Native American, 0.3% Asian, <0.1% Pacific Islander, 51.1% from other races, and 3.0% from two or more races. 95.2% of the population were Hispanic or Latino of any race.

Of the 1,818 households 59.4% had children under the age of 18 living with them, 70.9% were married couples living together, 16.3% had a female householder with no husband present, and 9.1% were non-families. 7.8% of households were one person and 4.2% were one person aged 65 or older. The average household size was 3.99 and the average family size was 4.21.

The age distribution was 38.9% under the age of 18, 11.2% from 18 to 24, 28.3% from 25 to 44, 14.4% from 45 to 64, and 7.2% 65 or older. The median age was 25 years. For every 100 females, there were 96.5 males. For every 100 females age 18 and over, there were 92.3 males.

The median household income was $26,544 and the median family income  was $27,944. Males had a median income of $21,619 versus $16,677 for females. The per capita income for the city was $7,960. About 24.0% of families and 26.6% of the population were below the poverty line, including 31.8% of those under age 18 and 27.9% of those age 65 or over.

Education
Somerton is served by the Somerton Elementary School District, the Crane Elementary School District, and the Yuma Union High School District. PPEP TEC High Schools's José Yepez Learning Center is located in Somerton.

Events

Somerton has an annual Tamale Festival that benefits students from the area who will be attending Arizona State University. More than 20,000 visitors attend the festival each year.  The festival is put together by The El Diablito Arizona State University (ASU) Alumni chapter.  The chapter was established by ASU graduates who have returned to work and live in the Yuma/Somerton/San Luis areas.

Transportation
Somerton is served by Yuma County Area Transit, which connects with Greyhound in Yuma.

Images of Somerton

References

External links
Somerton photo gallery at Flickr
Somerton Named NerdWallet's 5th City on the Rise in Arizona

Cities in Yuma County, Arizona
Cities in Arizona
Populated places established in 1898
1898 establishments in Arizona Territory